Events from the year 1748 in Wales.

Incumbents

Lord Lieutenant of North Wales (Lord Lieutenant of Anglesey, Caernarvonshire, Flintshire, Merionethshire, Montgomeryshire) – George Cholmondeley, 3rd Earl of Cholmondeley 
Lord Lieutenant of Glamorgan – Charles Powlett, 3rd Duke of Bolton
Lord Lieutenant of Brecknockshire and Lord Lieutenant of Monmouthshire – Thomas Morgan
Lord Lieutenant of Cardiganshire – Wilmot Vaughan, 3rd Viscount Lisburne
Lord Lieutenant of Carmarthenshire – vacant until 1755
Lord Lieutenant of Denbighshire – Sir Robert Salusbury Cotton, 3rd Baronet (until 27 August); Richard Myddelton (from 20 August)
Lord Lieutenant of Pembrokeshire – Sir Arthur Owen, 3rd Baronet
Lord Lieutenant of Radnorshire – William Perry

Bishop of Bangor – Zachary Pearce (from 21 February)
Bishop of Llandaff – John Gilbert (until 29 December)
Bishop of St Asaph – Samuel Lisle (until 17 March) Robert Hay Drummond (from 24 April)
Bishop of St Davids – The Hon. Richard Trevor

Events
8 March - With the death of the childless William Herbert, 3rd Marquess of Powis, the title becomes extinct.  Henry Arthur Herbert subsequently becomes 1st Earl of Powis.
Richard Wilson paints the two eldest sons of Frederick, Prince of Wales.
Joseph Harris becomes Assay-Master at the Royal Mint.
A major eisteddfod is held at Selattyn.
William Williams Pantycelyn marries Mary Francis of Llansawel.
The Salusbury family leave Lleweni Hall.

Arts and literature

New books
Lewis Morris - Plans of Harbours, Bays, and Roads in St. George's and the Bristol Channels

Music

Births
1 September - Thomas Johnes, landowner (died 1816)

Deaths
8 March - William Herbert, 3rd Marquess of Powis, 50
27 August - Sir Robert Salusbury Cotton, 3rd Baronet, 53
December - John Harris, Sr., Welsh-descended American trader, 75

References

1748 by country
1748 in Great Britain